Chantal Soucy is a Canadian politician in Quebec, who was elected to the National Assembly of Quebec in the 2014 election. She represents the electoral district of Saint-Hyacinthe as a member of the Coalition Avenir Québec.

She was also the party's candidate in Verchères in the 2012 election.

References

Coalition Avenir Québec MNAs
Living people
French Quebecers
People from Montérégie
Women MNAs in Quebec
21st-century Canadian politicians
21st-century Canadian women politicians
Year of birth missing (living people)